Ray Moore is an American gasser drag racer.

Driving a Chevrolet-powered 1940 Willys dubbed Chicken Coupe,   he won NHRA's B/GS national championship at Indianapolis Raceway Park in 1961.

References

Sources
Davis, Larry. Gasser Wars, North Branch, MN:  Cartech, 2003, pp. 182 & 187.

Dragster drivers
American racing drivers